The Medieval Underworld is a 1972 illustrated book authored by Andrew McCall, published by Barnes & Noble Books in New York. It details the basis for criminal and ecclesiastical justice from the fall of Rome to about 1500.

The book has been distinguished in Mark Galeotti's Paths of Wickedness and Crimes for its discussion of organized crime in medieval Europe, and it forms part of the basis of the IEA's overview course on Crime and Society.

Overview 
In popular culture, The Medieval Underworld has been suggested as a source of primary material for role-playing game developers.

In medieval times there existed an insistence on conformity which bordered on the obsessive. This colourful account explores those times from the viewpoint of the men and women who were seen to be on the margins of society - who either would not, or could not, conform to the conventions of their era. The activities of outlaws, brigands, homosexuals, heretics, witches, Jews, prostitutes, thieves, vagabonds and other 'transgressors' are detailed here, as are the punishments - often barbarously savage - which were meted out to them by State and Church. Full of fascinating and unusual characters and facts which greatly enhance our view of the Middle Ages, The Medieval Underworld will enthral anyone interested in medieval social history or the history of crime and punishment. Book jacket.

References

See also 
 Thieves' guild

1972 non-fiction books
History books about the Middle Ages
Criminology
Non-fiction crime books
History of criminal justice